Bill Foster may refer to:

Sports
 Bill Foster (baseball) (1904–1978), Negro leagues baseball player
 Bill Foster (basketball, born 1929) (1929–2016), college basketball head coach at Rutgers, Utah, Duke, South Carolina, and Northwestern
 Bill Foster (basketball, born 1936) (1936–2015), college basketball head coach at Charlotte, Miami, Clemson, and Virginia Tech

Politics
 Bill I. Foster (born 1946), American politician, Missouri state senator
 Bill Foster (politician) (born 1955), U.S. Congressman (D-IL), physicist
 Bill Foster (mayor) (born 1963), mayor of St. Petersburg, Florida

Entertainment
 Bill Foster (director) (1932–2011), television director
 Bill Foster (comics), fictional Marvel Comics superhero known variously as Black Goliath, Giant-Man, and Goliath

See also
 Billy Foster (1937–1967), Canadian racecar driver
 William Foster (disambiguation)